Before This Night Is Over is a 1966 Slovak drama film directed by Peter Solan.

External links 

1966 drama films
1966 films
Slovak drama films
Slovak-language films